Headstrong may refer to:

 Headstrong (band), a Canadian rap rock band
 Headstrong (Headstrong album), the self-titled 2002 debut album by Headstrong
 Headstrong (Ashley Tisdale album), the 2007 debut album by Ashley Tisdale
 "Headstrong" (Ashley Tisdale song), the title track of the aforementioned album
 "Headstrong", a song by Earshot from their 2002 debut album Letting Go
 "Headstrong" (Trapt song), the 2002 debut single by Trapt from their self-titled album
 Headstrong (play), a stage play by Patrick Link
 Operation Headstrong (2003–2004), involving the training of Afghan commandos by British special forces
 Headstrong, an alias used by electronic music producer Geert Huinink
 Headstrong (Transformers), a character in Transformers fiction

See also
 King Louis X of France (1289-1316), called the Headstrong 
 Headstrong Club, an 18th-century English debating society